St. Agatha (French: Sainte Agathe) is a town in Aroostook County, Maine, United States.  The population was 730 at the 2020 census.

Geography

Demographics

2010 census

As of the census of 2010, there were 747 people, 357 households, and 215 families living in the town. The racial makeup of the town was 99.1% White, 0.3% African American, 0.3% Native American, 0.1% Asian, and 0.3% from two or more races. Hispanic or Latino of any race were 0.1% of the population.

There were 357 households, of which 18.8% had children under the age of 18 living with them, 50.7% were married couples living together, 6.4% had a female householder with no husband present, 3.1% had a male householder with no wife present, and 39.8% were non-families. 35.3% of all households were made up of individuals, and 16.2% had someone living alone who was 65 years of age or older. The average household size was 2.09 and the average family size was 2.67.

The median age in the town was 51.6 years. 17.4% of residents were under the age of 18; 4% were between the ages of 18 and 24; 20.4% were from 25 to 44; 36.7% were from 45 to 64; and 21.4% were 65 years of age or older. The gender makeup of the town was 51.4% male and 48.6% female.

2000 census

As of the census of 2000, there were 802 people, 350 households, and 235 families living in the town. There were 460 housing units at an average density of 15.6 per square mile (6.0/km). The racial makeup of the town was 99.63% White, 0.12% Native American, 0.12% Pacific Islander, and 0.12% from two or more races. Hispanic or Latino of any race were 0.25% of the population.

There were 350 households, out of which 24.3% had children under the age of 18 living with them, 59.1% were married couples living together, 3.1% had a female householder with no husband present, and 32.6% were non-families. 28.3% of all households were made up of individuals, and 14.6% had someone living alone who was 65 years of age or older.  The average household size was 2.27 and the average family size was 2.76.

In the town, the population was spread out, with 18.7% under the age of 18, 5.1% from 18 to 24, 24.4% from 25 to 44, 34.3% from 45 to 64, and 17.5% who were 65 years of age or older.  The median age was 46 years. For every 100 females, there were 100.0 males.  For every 100 females age 18 and over, there were 99.4 males.

The median income for a household in the town was $30,833, and the median income for a family was $36,691. Males had a median income of $29,808 versus $19,167 for females. The per capita income for the town was $15,535.  About 6.6% of families and 10.0% of the population were below the poverty line, including 6.4% of those under age 18 and 22.5% of those age 65 or over.

See also
 Lagassey Farm

References

Notable people

 Nathan-Gabriel Guerrette, Musician
 Judy Paradis, State Senator

External links
Town of St. Agatha

Towns in Aroostook County, Maine
Towns in Maine